Ponto Lake Township is a township in Cass County, Minnesota, United States. The population was 530 as of the 2000 census. The etymology of the name Ponto is obscure.

Geography
According to the United States Census Bureau, the township has a total area of 36.4 square miles (94.2 km), of which 29.6 square miles (76.7 km) is land and 6.8 square miles (17.5 km) (18.58%) is water.

Unincorporated communities
 Pontoria

Major highways
  Minnesota State Highway 84
  Minnesota State Highway 87

Lakes
 Bass Lake
 Black Portage Lake
 Blind Lake (southeast half)
 Corset Lake
 Deadman Lake
 Deep Portage Lake
 E Twin Lake
 Elbow Lake
 Hand Lake
 Harriet Lake
 Hay Lake (west three-quarters)
 Island Lake (south half)
 Jail Lake
 Little Deep Lake
 Lizzie Lake
 Lake Ada
 Lake Hattie (vast majority)
 Long Lake #2
 Mud Lake (east quarter)
 Mud Portage Lake
 Ponto Lake
 Rice Portage Lake (east half)
 Round Lake
 Rush Lake
 Smiley Lake
 Stony Lake
 Sylvan Lake
 Tamarack Lake
 W Twin Lake

Adjacent townships
 Woodrow Township (north)
 Wabedo Township (northeast)
 Blind Lake Township (east)
 Timothy Township, Crow Wing County (southeast)
 Barclay Township (south)
 Gail Lake Township, Crow Wing County (south)
 Pine River Township (southwest)
 Powers Township (west)
 Birch Lake Township (northwest)

Cemeteries
The township contains Ponto Lake Cemetery.

Demographics
As of the census of 2000, there were 530 people, 253 households, and 176 families residing in the township. The population density was 17.9 people per square mile (6.9/km). The racial makeup of the township was 97.55% White, 1.32% Native American, 0.38% Asian, and 0.75% from two or more races. Hispanic or Latino of any race were 0.38% of the population.

There were 253 households, out of which 14.6% had children under the age of 18 living with them, 64.4% were married couples living together, 2.0% had a female householder with no husband present, and 30.4% were non-families. 27.3% of all households were made up of individuals, and 10.7% had someone living alone who was 65 years of age or older.  The average household size was 2.09 and the average family size was 2.48.

In the township the population was spread out, with 13.6% under the age of 18, 5.1% from 18 to 24, 14.7% from 25 to 44, 41.7% from 45 to 64, and 24.9% who were 65 years of age or older.  The median age was 53 years. For every 100 females, there were 112.0 males.  For every 100 females age 18 and over, there were 107.2 males.

The median income for a household in the township was $27,105, and the median income for a family was $31,171. Males had a median income of $31,500 versus $22,188 for females. The per capita income for the township was $17,642.  About 6.1% of families and 9.5% of the population were below the poverty line, including 18.2% of those under age 18 and 8.6% of those age 65 or over.

References
 United States National Atlas
 United States Census Bureau 2007 TIGER/Line Shapefiles
 United States Board on Geographic Names (GNIS)

Townships in Cass County, Minnesota
Brainerd, Minnesota micropolitan area
Townships in Minnesota